Wilhelm Karmann GmbH, commonly known as simply Karmann, was a German automobile manufacturer and contract manufacturer based in Osnabrück.

Founded by Wilhelm Karmann in 1901, the company specialised in a variety of automotive roles, including design, production and assembly of components for a wide variety of automobile manufacturers, including Chrysler, Porsche, Mercedes-Benz and Volkswagen Group.

The company was broken up in 2010, after filing for bankruptcy the previous year. Its convertible roof components were purchased by Webasto, Magna Steyr, and Valmet Automotive— while the Osnabrück assembly plant, vehicle development, tools, and assembly systems were transferred to Volkswagen.

History
Karmann was established in 1901 when Wilhelm Karmann purchased Klages, a coachbuilder founded in 1874, and renamed the business. The company then grew together with the expanding automobile industry. Karmann became known for its work on convertibles, coupés, and other niche models.

After World War II and the reconstruction of the plant destroyed in the war, Karmann turned its focus on contract manufacturing and development for Volkswagen. As early as 1935/36, Ferdinand Porsche had asked Karmann to investigate the possibilities of developing a prototype for a Volkswagen convertible. The chaos of the war prevented the idea from being pushed forward, as well as the cooperation with Volkswagen from starting 15 years earlier. On 1 August 1949, Wilhelm Karmann signed an order from Volkswagen for 1,000 "four-seater, four-wing convertible Type 15" - the Volkswagen Beetle Cabriolet. Over the next 50 years, a total of 2,548,765 Beetle Cabriolets would be produced for Volkswagen.

In addition to the Beetle Cabriolet and Karmann Ghia, all cabriolet variants of the VW Golf as well as the Scirocco, and Corrado were built by Karmann. The 1960s saw the expansion of the company and further vehicle plants were set up in São Bernardo do Campo (Brazil) and Rheine. In the years after 1965, complete vehicles and bodies of the BMW New Class Coupé, and its successor, the larger E9, were produced in Rheine. Installation of the engine and final assembly were handled by BMW at the Munich plant. In the late 1970s and 1980s, Karmann produced the body shell of the BMW 6 Series Coupé and the convertible models of the Ford Escort as complete vehicles. From the beginning of the 1990s, the Ford Escort RS Cosworth, European-market Kia Sportages and from 1997 the Audi Cabriolet (type 89) and the Audi A4 Cabriolet (from 2002), as well as the Chrysler Crossfire (2003) and Mercedes-Benz CLK Cabriolet (A209, 2003) were produced as complete vehicles. Production of VW's Vento/Jetta (1992/93) and the Golf Variant A3 (1997/99) also shifted from Volkswagen in Wolfsburg to Karmann in Osnabrück.

From 1985 to 1989, Karmann produced the Merkur XR4Ti (an American-market version of the Ford Sierra for the Merkur brand); and from 2003 to 2007, the Chrysler Crossfire coupe and convertible for Chrysler, at the time DaimlerChrysler. Many Karmann-built vehicles feature a small wagon wheel emblem, the coat of arms of Osnabrück, where the company was founded. A large part of the development of the Crossfire was done independently by Karmann, and the vehicle was produced at their Osnabrück facility. Karmann U.S. also supplied the top sub-assemblies for the convertible variants of both the third-generation Chrysler Sebring and Ford Mustang.

Karmann assembled complete knock down (CKD) kits in an agreement with American Motors (AMC). In 1968, AMC introduced the Javelin, a new competitor in the U.S. "pony car" segment. AMC did not have a manufacturing subsidiary in Europe, therefore, Karmann assembled the American-designed car for distribution in Europe. Karmann built the cars in Rheine with   V8 engines. About 90% of the necessary components were shipped by boat from the U.S. All were SST trim versions and their name, Javelin 79-K stood for AMC's "79" model number and the "K" for Karmann.

A small number of vehicles were also produced in Brazil (São Bernardo do Campo). The Osnabrück facility also produced the chassis and body panels of the Spyker C8 Spyder.

The production facilities in Osnabrück, Chorzów, Poland, Yokohama, Japan, Sunderland, UK, Puebla, Mexico, and Plymouth Township, U.S. manufactured roof systems for convertibles including the Mercedes-Benz CLK, the Renault Mégane CC, the Nissan Micra C+C, the Pontiac G6, the Chrysler Sebring, the Ford Mustang, the Bentley Continental, the BMW 1 Series, and the Volkswagen New Beetle Cabriolet.

The Karmann Ghia 
The VW Karmann Ghia Type 14 is Karmann's best-known vehicle. Wilhelm Karmann Jr. conceived the idea in 1953, one year after taking over his father's car body company in Osnabrück. Karmann wanted to produce a sporty and open two-seater on the technical basis of the VW Beetle. Volkswagen was also interested in a sporty roadster that would be loved by American soldiers stationed in Europe and taken to the USA.

Luigi Segre, the boss of Carrozzeria Ghia in Turin, was included in the plan on the occasion of the Geneva Automobile Salon. A chassis of the beetle was shipped from Osnabrück to Italy and Segre put a self-designed body on the chassis. To Karmann's amazement, Segre presented him in Paris not a roadster, but a coupé.

Shortly afterwards, the automobile artwork was presented to the VW General Director back in Osnabrück. VW boss Heinrich Nordhoff liked the coupé with its flowing lines and rounded shapes, so he agreed to build the car on the same day. In the first year of production, a total of 10,000 coupés were delivered instead of the planned 3,000 units.

The VW Karmann Ghia became a sales success with over 360,000 units, even if the performance of the car with only 30 HP and 115 km/h top speed did not correspond to the sporty appearance. 1957 followed the Karmann Ghia Cabriolet and 1961 the bigger Type 34, the Karmann Ghia 1550, the design of which also came from Carrozzeria Ghia.

In the quantities produced by Karmann, the Karmann Ghia coupés and convertibles were later slightly surpassed by both the Golf Cabriolet and the Scirocco; only when the first Karmann Ghia types were added together via the coupé and convertible was the Karmann Ghia the most successful Karmann vehicle.

Production to 2010 

Since its beginning in 1901, Karmann built more than three million complete vehicles of the models as follows, exceptions as indicated:

Car modules
Chassis
Chrysler Crossfire Coupé 2001–2007
Chrysler Crossfire Roadster 2003–2007
Mercedes-Benz SLK
Spyker C8 Spyder
Roof modules
Audi A4 and Audi S4 Cabriolet, 2001
Bentley Continental GTC convertible, 2006
BMW 1 Series convertible
Mercedes CLK convertible
Nissan Micra C+C retractable hardtop, 2005
Renault Mégane CC retractable hardtop, 2002
Volkswagen New Beetle Cabriolet
Pontiac G6 retractable hardtop, 2007
Chrysler Sebring retractable hardtop and convertible softtop, 2007
Ford Mustang convertible, 2007

Motorhomes
The first Karmann motorhomes were launched in 1974 based on the Volkswagen Type 2 'Bay Window' chassis. The bodies were of a sandwich structure. These motorhomes had two beds, kitchen, shower, waste water tank, rear body supports, leisure battery, toilet, water heater and gas heating. Options included the luggage rack over the driver's cab. Approximately 1,000 units were produced through 1979.

With the introduction of the Volkswagen T2/3 - also known as the (T3/Vanagon/Transporter/T25) in 1979, the motorhomes received a permanent overhead area with a bed for two people. Called Karmann Gipsy, 741 were made between 1980 and 1992. This number excludes 30 or more Type 3 Syncro models made between 1986 and 1989, and 7 Syncro 16" models made between 1991 and 1992. In addition 113 Cheetah T2/3's were manufactured between 1986 and 1990 to make a total 891 Volkswagen T3 Karmann Coachbuilt Motorhomes - all produced in Karmann Rheine factory and not at Osnabruck as commonly believed.

From 1978 to 1996, a total of 3,103 Volkswagen LT-based models were produced. These included the LT "M", LT "L 1", LT "L 2", LT "L Distance Wide", LT "L Distance-Wide Gold", LT "H Distance-Wide", LT "H Distance-Wide Gold", LT "S Distance-Wide" and the top-of-the-line LT "Distance-Wide Autovilla".

In 1991, the Karmann motorhome design was updated and based on the Volkswagen T4. The Gipsy and Cheetah models names were retained in the form of the Gipsy I (SWB) and Cheetah (LWB). In 1996 two new models were introduced namely the Colorado and Missouri. The Volkswagen Transporter (T5)-based versions were introduced in 2003.

Insolvency proceedings
On 8 April 2009, Karmann filed for insolvency proceedings due to the sharp decline in demand for cars, and the company's financial obligations. The employment protection contracts of the large OEMs with the unions and the technological progress in vehicle construction led to the fact that the production of niche vehicles was no longer outsourced, but rather carried out within the OEM production network. Volkswagen, Karmann's longtime partner, revealed on 24 October that it had made an offer to acquire the company.

On 20 November, Volkswagen took over the factory buildings, machinery, plant and land from the Karmann insolvent estate. With the exception of roof systems, Volkswagen Osnabrück encompasses former Karmann divisions: production systems (metal group), press shop, body shop, paint shop, assembly and technical development.

On 4 November 2010, Finland's Valmet Automotive signed an agreement to buy Karmann's roof-component sections in Osnabrück and Żary, Poland. Karmann's North American operations were sold in August 2010 to Webasto Group. Effective 25 February 2010, the Japanese production site of Karmann was acquired by Magna International. Magna Steyr also manufactured the roof system for the Infiniti G37 Convertible in addition to the roof system for the Nissan 370Z Roadster.

Production after 2010 
The Volkswagen-owned operations have produced the following:

References

External links

 
Car manufacturers of Germany
Coachbuilders of Germany
Convertible top suppliers
Electric vehicle manufacturers of Germany
Companies based in Lower Saxony
Osnabrück
Vehicle manufacturing companies established in 1901
1901 establishments in Germany
Contract vehicle manufacturers